The Salt River is a  river in the U.S. state of Kentucky that drains . It begins near Parksville, Kentucky, rising from the north slope of Persimmon Knob south of KY 300 between Alum Springs and Wilsonville, and ends at the Ohio River near West Point. Taylorsville Lake is formed from the Salt River, and Guist Creek Lake is also in its drainage basin.

Annual flooding swells the normally quiet waters to a rapidly flooding torrent, especially along the Rolling Fork, which runs largely along the base of steep, shaly knobs that mark the boundary between the Pennyroyal Region (a Mississippian limestone plateau) to the west and south and the Outer Bluegrass. (See the Ohio River flood of 1937 at Louisville, for an example.) The Taylorsville Lake Dam, built in the early 1970s, has tamed the worst of the floods and changed the nature of the river downstream. Some flooding still occurs, especially near the Brashears Creek confluence at Taylorsville, but it is primarily back flow from the Ohio. The river receives the most rain in the month of May and the least in September, according to data from the local National Weather Service office.

Dams were proposed on the Rolling Fork at Howardstown and on the Beech Fork at Campground, but were not deemed economically feasible. These two tributaries are marked on maps as the Rolling Fork River and the Beech Fork River. A tributary of the Beech Fork, the Chaplin River, rises near the source of the Salt.

Wildlife
The Salt River has areas protected by the Nature Conservancy because of several rare creatures and plants. The flood waters created rich bottom lands and support a variety of wetland habitats. Turtles, fish, waterfowl abound, deer, river otters and beaver are some of the typical animals living in the area. However, some not so common animals live in the area like the Indiana bat, gray bat, fanshell, and Louisville (Knob Creek) crawfish.

In addition to the animals, there are several rare or unique plants that live in the area. These include Carex crawei (Crawe's sedge), Cypripedium candidum (small white lady's-slipper), Leavenworthia exigua var. laciniata (glade cress), Sporobolus heterolepis (Prairie dropseed), Symphyotrichum pratense (silky aster), and Viola egglestonii (Eggleston's violet).

Geology
The river has a  drainage area and is the fifth largest watershed in the state. The terrain around much of the river is deeply ridged until it nears its outlet at the Ohio, near West Point. This creates areas of flat topped ridges separated by narrow valleys or "hollows," often washed out by small creeks or streams draining into the river. Flash floods are common in these narrow valleys, and they complicate travel between ridges, often requiring a circuitous path. It was not uncommon for folks in the valley and folks on the ridge-tops to see each other infrequently.

On cool mornings, fog fills the valley floor, stabilizing and cooling the temperature, while on the ridge, it may be hot and dry. Tobacco, corn and soybeans do well in the lower fields, even while droughts parched the drier, hotter ridges.

History

The river received its name from the Bullitt's Lick settlement that was founded at an animal salt lick in 1779 by Henry Crist. The river has been used for navigation and sustenance since humans occupied the area. Old Indian artifacts are found along the length of the river valley by farmers and new construction work in the area. Log cabins and settlements grew on the banks, using it as a source of water, power and transportation. The river bank flats and water made travel over through the ridged terrain easier.

During the American Civil War, an earth-walled fort was established on a tall hill overlooking the Ohio, near the Salt River. It guarded passage through Louisville and south on the road along the Ohio River, which much later became known as the Dixie Highway. It also protected against Southern forces attacking from the Ohio River and up the Salt River. Fort Duffield may be the best-preserved earthen Civil War fort in America and illustrates how important river access via the Salt River and the Ohio was to early travelers.

In 1983 the U.S. Army Corps of Engineers completed a dam on the river just above Taylorsville, forming Taylorsville Lake.

Economy
During early settlements, high water was used to ship timber and local product down stream to the Ohio River. In quieter waters, small boats came upstream, helping settlers move goods to remote farms. It also flooded towns like Taylorsville, Shepherdsville, and to a lesser extent southern Louisville and West Point, changing their architecture and growth pattern.

A number of mills used to dot the length of the Salt River and its tributaries, using the water to grind feed and flour, saw lumber and more. These include those of Bullitt's Lick and Bell's Mill on Floyd's Fork.

The Salt River was a primary water source for a number of towns and farms. Taylorsville, Mount Washington and Shepherdsville all used to draw water from the river until water lines were extended from Louisville.

See also

 Salt River (politics): an expression based on the river
 Salt River, Kentucky: an unincorporated community on the river
 List of rivers of Kentucky

References

External links
Watersheds of Kentucky - Salt River basin

Landforms of Louisville, Kentucky
Rivers of Kentucky
Rivers of Bullitt County, Kentucky
Rivers of Boyle County, Kentucky
Rivers of Hardin County, Kentucky
Rivers of Spencer County, Kentucky
Tributaries of the Ohio River